This is a partial list of molecules that contain 7 carbon atoms.

See also
 Carbon number
 List of compounds with carbon number 6
 List of compounds with carbon number 8

C07